Miogryllus saussurei is a cricket in the genus Miogryllus ("striped crickets"), in the subfamily Gryllinae ("field crickets"). A common name for Miogryllus saussurei is "eastern striped cricket".

References

Further reading
 
 Field Guide To Grasshoppers, Katydids, And Crickets Of The United States, Capinera, Scott, Walker. 2004. Cornell University Press.

External links
 NCBI Taxonomy Browser, Miogryllus saussurei

Gryllinae
Insects described in 1838